is a Family Computer video game that was released in 1989 to an exclusively Japanese market.

Summary
The player must earn money in order to become the wealthiest gambler in the world. The game, set in New York City, is considered a spin-off from the Pachio-kun franchise. Al Capone has a cameo role in this game even though he lived about one thousand miles to the west (Chicago) in real life.

Roads, taxis and automobiles are not portrayed in the game. However, a black limousine that escorts the player from the air force base to the final casino is portrayed as driving on grass. This is in direct opposition to the real New York City where the majority of the surface is concrete (either as roads, parking lots, or as foundations for the buildings). Only parks and some older residential districts use grass in their design in the real world. Buildings are either shown as dilapidated tenements, shiny towers, or as flashy casinos.

An English language translation was made in 2007 by a ROM hacker who goes by the nickname of "Pale Dim." Using the game's upper case letters that resemble the Joystix font, the English translation allows players in English-speaking countries to better understand the game. One of the changes made was to change the explosion sound from the Japanese Bom to the English Boom.

Gameplay

General gameplay

The player starts out in the poorest district of Brooklyn and must work through the boroughs of New York City outside Manhattan, including Queens or The Bronx, in order to amass wealth.  With luck and finesse, the player can ultimately break the bank in New Jersey.  To enter a casino, the player must find a permit (which serves as photo identification for the casinos) somewhere in Brooklyn. Slot machines come in denominations from $1–$100000 depending on the neighborhood and the presence of a VIP card. Three types of slot machines can be played at each level and the player is photographed when winning the jackpot.

Players must be wary of dice games that have dangerous risks in addition to card games - they randomly appear like monster battles in traditional role-playing games. Many buildings including airports, police stations, and casinos either help or hinder the player's attempts to earn enough money on the slot machines for passage to the wealthier district. Guns (in the form of a pistol) can be found that can protect the player against muggers. However, the police will confiscate the weapon from this player once he arrives at a certain area in Manhattan. Pachiko-kun (the player) will also be arrested and will be held unless a $100,000 ($ in today's money) bail can be paid in full.

Glitch
The game gets a little fuzzy when the player only has $10 left to spend and the player is in Manhattan. The game isn't over but the player cannot spend it because it is not even considered to be a single token. This would result in a walking dead situation; the only remedy is to reset the game.

References

External links
 American Dream at Stage Select

1989 video games
Adventure games
Coconuts Japan games
Japan-exclusive video games
Nintendo Entertainment System games
Nintendo Entertainment System-only games
Single-player video games
Video games developed in Japan
Video games set in New York City